Hakea horrida is a shrub in the family Proteacea and is endemic to an area in the Wheatbelt, Great Southern and Goldfields-Esperance regions of Western Australia. It is a small dense shrub, extremely prickly with large creamy white scented flowers.

Description
A very dense and impenetrable species due to its extremely prickly foliage. It blooms from August to October and produces large scented white to cream flowers in clusters in the leaf axils. They may appear in a raceme of up 22 flowers.

Taxonomy and naming
This species was formally described by Robyn Mary Barker in 1990. It is named from the Latin horridus- prickly, referring to the extremely sharp point on the leaf.

Distribution and habitat
Hakea horrida grows from Kondinin south to Lake Grace and east to Esperance in heath and scrubland on sandy-loam with lateritic gravel.

Conservation status
Hakea horrida is classified as "not threatened" by the Western Australian Government.

References

horrida
Eudicots of Western Australia
Plants described in 1990
Taxa named by Robyn Mary Barker